Sankt Veit an der Gölsen is a town in the district of Lilienfeld in the Austrian federal state of Lower Austria.

Geography 
Sankt Veit an der Gölsen is located in the Mostviertel at the south-western edge of the Vienna Woods and at the beginning of the Lower Austrian Prealps. The river Gölsen flows through the municipal territory. The area of the town is 78.12 square kilometer, whereby 55.98% consists of woodland area.

Parts of the town are Außer-Wiesenbach, Inner-Wiesenbach, Kerschenbach, Kropfsdorf, Maierhöfen, Obergegend, Pfenningbach, Rainfeld, Schwarzenbach an der Gölsen, St. Veit an der Gölsen, Steinwandleiten, Traisenort, Wiesenfeld and Wobach.

History 
In the antiquity the territory was part of the province Noricum. Located in the Austrian core country Lower Austria it took part in the changeful history of Austria.

Population

Politics 
The Mayor of the town is Johann Gastegger. After the election in 2010 for the local government the SPÖ has 15 mandates, the ÖVP has 7 mandates and the FPÖ has one mandate.

Notable residents 
Clemens Lashofer (February 2, 1941 - July 6, 2009) - Abbot of Göttweig Abbey.

References

Cities and towns in Lilienfeld District